Alamgir Mohammad Mahfuzullah Farid is a Bangladesh Nationalist Party politician and the former Member of Parliament from Cox's Bazar-2.

Career
Farid was elected to parliament in 1996 from Cox's Bazar-2 as a candidate of Bangladesh Nationalist Party. He was reelected from Cox's Bazar-2 in 2001. He served in the Public Undertaking Committee in the Parliament. During his term, he hired workers to cut down thousands of trees in state owned mangrove forests in Sonadia Island.

Personal life
Farid's brother, Shahidullah, is the Chairman of Baro Moheshkhali Union Parishad. On 2 September 2006, Chittagong Coastal Forest Department published Shahidullah's name in a list of individuals who grabbed forest land.

Controversy
On 13 May 2007, he was arrested by Rapid Action Battalion on corruption charges. He was arrested on 5 extortion case filed against him in Moheshkhali Police Station on 15 April 2007. Anti-Corruption Commission filed charges against him and his wife on corruption on 29 April 2008.

References

Bangladesh Nationalist Party politicians
Living people
6th Jatiya Sangsad members
7th Jatiya Sangsad members
8th Jatiya Sangsad members
Year of birth missing (living people)
People from Cox's Bazar District